Louvenia (Kitty) Black Perkins was Chief Designer of Fashions and Doll Concepts for Mattel's Barbie line for over twenty-five years. Her designs include the "First Black Barbie" (1979-1980) the first African American doll from Mattel to have the name Barbie and not be a friend of Barbie but Barbie herself, "Shani and Friends" (1991) a short-lived line of African-American dolls, "Holiday Barbie" (1988, 1989, 1990, 1996), "Fashion Savvy Barbie" (1997), "Bathtime Barbie" and  "Brandy" (1999).

Life and career
An African-American woman, Kitty was born February 13, 1948, in racially segregated Spartanburg, South Carolina. The daughter of Luther Black and Helen Goode Black, she is one of seven children. She graduated from Carver High School, Spartanburg's black High School, which closed when the school system was desegregated in 1970. In 1967 she moved to California, attending Los Angeles Trade Technical College. Black graduated with an associate degree in fashion design in 1971.

She worked in non-doll fashion for six years before responding to a blind classified ad from Mattel. She reports never having had a Barbie doll until she purchased one to prepare for the interview. She became principal designer for Barbie in 1978. In 1991 The Los Angeles Times reported that Black-Perkins was responsible for over 100 designs a year, amounting to over one fifth of all of the designs for Barbie. She has received the doll industry's highest honor, the Doll of the Year (DOTY) award.

In 1985 and 1987 she earned Mattel's Chairman's Award, the highest recognition a Mattel employee can receive. In May 2001, Mattel donated a Barbie that Black-Perkins designed for the permanent collection of the South Carolina State Museum. It is a Barbie dressed in a pink satin and tulle ball gown with a double row of rosettes at the hem.

Black-Perkin's influence has been noted in Ebony, Essence, LA Magazine, Woman's Day, and Sister to Sister magazines. In 1994 she was a Woman of the Year honoree at the annual 'Woman Keeping the Dream Alive’ banquet, National Counsel of Negro Women. She is also an inductee into the Black Hall of Fame.

References

Barbie
Living people
1948 births